Torfaen is a county borough, in Wales.

Torfaen may also refer to:

 Torfaen (Senedd constituency)
 Torfaen (UK Parliament constituency)